St. Saviour's Anglican Church is an historic one-storey rustic Carpenter Gothic Anglican church building located in the National Historic Site of Barkerville, British Columbia. Designed by the Rev. James Reynard, it was built by John Bruce and J. G. Mann. Construction began in 1868 but was not finished until after the church's first service was held on September 18, 1870. Its Carpenter Gothic architectural features include lancet windows and board and batten walls on the exterior as well as interior. A porch on the right side which appeared in early photographs is no longer in existence. Today it is part of Barkerville Historic Town and admission to the church is included in the price of admission to the town. Lay services are conducted in the church most days during the summer season.
 

Currently, St. Saviour's is featured in Craig Spence's novel in progress Stained Glass. The church is also used as a music venue.

Further reading
 Joan Sherman Weir, Canada's gold rush church : a history of St. Saviour's Church in Barkerville, British Columbia, ca. 1986

References

External links
 St. Saviour Church on flickr

Carpenter Gothic church buildings in British Columbia
19th-century Anglican church buildings in Canada
Anglican church buildings in British Columbia